Glenn Preston (born 13 April 1992) is a New Zealand rugby union player who plays for the  in the Super Rugby competition.  His position of choice is flanker.

References 

New Zealand rugby union players
1992 births
Living people
Rugby union flankers
Rugby union players from Auckland